Muscavirus is a genus of viruses, in the family Hytrosaviridae. The fly Musca domestica is the natural host. There is only one species in this genus: Musca hytrosavirus. Diseases associated with this genus include: salivary gland hypertrophy, and complete sterility of infected female flies by inhibiting eggs development.

Structure
Viruses in the genus Muscavirus are enveloped, with rod-shaped geometries. The diameter is around 50 nm. Genomes are circular, around 124kb in length. The genome has 108 open reading frames.

Life cycle
Viral replication is nuclear. DNA-templated transcription is the method of transcription. Musca domestica serve as the natural host. Transmission routes are parental and contamination.

References

External links
 ICTV Report: Hytrosaviridae
 Viralzone: Muscavirus

Hytrosaviridae
Virus genera